The West Haven A's were an American Minor League Baseball team that played in the Double-A Eastern League from 1972 to 1982. They were located in West Haven, Connecticut, and played their home games at Quigley Stadium. From 1972 to 1979, the team was known as the West Haven Yankees after their Major League Baseball affiliate, the New York Yankees. They became an affiliate of the Oakland Athletics in 1980 and changed their name to the West Haven Whitecaps for that season before becoming the West Haven A's through their final two years of play.

History

New York Yankees (1972–1979)
From 1972 to 1979, the team was affiliated with and named for the New York Yankees. During that eight-year period, West Haven — managed by future Major League skippers Bobby Cox, Doc Edwards, Mike Ferraro, and Stump Merrill — won four Eastern League championships and compiled a regular-season win–loss record of 611–496 (.552). In 1975, first baseman Dave Bergman was selected for the Eastern League Most Valuable Player Award. Edwards (1973), Ferraro (1977), and Merrill (1979) each won the Eastern League Manager of the Year Award.

Notable Yankees alumni

Steve Balboni
Jim Beattie
Dave Bergman
Ron Davis
Mike Fischlin
Damaso Garcia
Ron Guidry
Mike Heath
LaMarr Hoyt
Garth Iorg
Mickey Klutts
Joe Lefebvre
Willie McGee
Scott McGregor
Doc Medich
Jerry Narron
Domingo Ramos
Dave Righetti
Buck Showalter
Charlie Spikes
Pat Tabler
Willie Upshaw
Otto Velez

Oakland Athletics (1980–1982)
The Yankees entered into a deal with a new Double-A team, the Nashville Sounds of the Southern League, after the 1979 season. The West Haven franchise relocated to Lynn, Massachusetts, and became the Lynn Sailors. Concurrently, the Waterbury, Connecticut, franchise moved to West Haven in time for the 1980 season, bringing their affiliation with the Oakland Athletics, and renaming the team the West Haven Whitecaps.

The franchise changed its name again in 1981, this time to the West Haven A's. The last West Haven team, managed by Bob Didier, won the team's fifth and final Eastern League title, defeating the Lynn Sailors in the finals. In 1983, the franchise moved to Albany, New York, becoming the Albany A's.

Notable alumni
Keith Atherton
Mike Gallego
Donnie Hill
Bill Krueger
Steve Ontiveros
Tony Phillips

Season-by-season results

References
Specific

General

Defunct Eastern League (1938–present) teams
Yankees
West Haven, Connecticut
Professional baseball teams in Connecticut
New York Yankees minor league affiliates
Oakland Athletics minor league affiliates
Baseball teams in the New York metropolitan area
1982 disestablishments in Connecticut
Baseball teams established in 1972
Baseball teams disestablished in 1982
Defunct baseball teams in Connecticut